This is a list of flags used in the Grand Duchy of Luxembourg, a country in western Europe. For more information about the national flag, visit the article Flag of Luxembourg.

National flag

Ensign

Standard of the Grand Duke

Cities

Historical Flags

Historical Royal Flags

References
  

Luxembourg
Flags
Flags